Marie Wikoff (née Hesse) Suthers (March 12, 1895 – February 9, 1983) was an American politician and educator.

Born in Chicago, Illinois, Suthers lived in the Beverly neighborhood in Chicago. Suthers received her bachelor's degree from Chicago State University and taught adult education in the Chicago public schools system. She was involved with the Republican Party. Suthers served in the Illinois House of Representatives from 1951 to 1953. She then served on the Chicago Board of Elections from 1952 until 1981. Suthers died at the Little Company of Mary Hospital in Evergreen Park, Illinois.

Notes

1895 births
1983 deaths
Politicians from Chicago
Chicago State University alumni
Educators from Illinois
American women educators
Women state legislators in Illinois
Republican Party members of the Illinois House of Representatives
20th-century American politicians
20th-century American women politicians